Thomas, Tom or Tommy Armstrong may refer to:

Politicians
 Thomas Armstrong (Australian politician) (1885–1955), member of the New South Wales Legislative Council
 Thomas Armstrong (New York politician) (1785–1867), New York politician
 Thomas Armstrong (Wisconsin politician) (1858–1927), Wisconsin politician
 Sir Thomas Armstrong (English politician) (c. 1633–1684), English army officer and MP, executed for treason
 Thomas Armstrong (Florida politician) (born 1937), American politician in the state of Florida
 Thomas E. Armstrong (born 1959), American Republican politician from Pennsylvania
 Thomas H. Armstrong (1829–1891), American Lieutenant Governor of Minnesota
 Tom Armstrong (politician) (1903–1957), Australian politician from New South Wales
 Tommy Armstrong (New Zealand politician) (1902–1980), New Zealand politician

Sportspeople
 Thomas Armstrong (Oxford University cricketer) (1849–1929), English cricketer for Oxford University
 Thomas Armstrong (Nottinghamshire cricketer) (1872–1938), English cricketer for Nottinghamshire
 Thomas Armstrong (Australian cricketer) (1889–1963), Australian cricketer for Victoria
 Thomas Armstrong (Derbyshire cricketer) (1909–2000), English cricketer for Derbyshire
 Thomas Armstrong (footballer) (1898–?), English footballer for Liverpool
 Tom Armstrong (footballer) (born 1954), Northern Irish footballer
 Tom Armstrong (rugby league) (born 1989), English professional rugby league footballer
 Tommy Armstrong Jr. (born 1993), American football player
 Tommy Armstrong (bowls) (born 1939), England international lawn bowler

Other
 Sir Thomas Armstrong (musician) (1898–1994), English organist, conductor, educationalist and adjudicator
 Thomas Armstrong (author) (1899–1978), British novelist 
 Thomas Armstrong (painter) (1832–1911), English artist and arts administrator
 Thomas N. Armstrong III (1932–2011), American museum curator
 Thomas Armstrong (bishop) (1857–1930), Anglican bishop in Australia
 Tommy Armstrong (singer) (1848–1920), 19th century singer, songwriter from County Durham
 Tom Armstrong (cartoonist) (born 1950), American cartoonist

See also
 Thomas LeRoy Armstrong (born 1936), Canadian businessman and politician